Seňa (1249 Schena, 1251 Scyna, Zyna, 1255 Scynna, 1402 Czena) is a village and municipality in Košice-okolie District in the Košice Region of eastern Slovakia.

Etymology 
According to István Kniezsa, the name is of Slavic origin, but he did not clarified its etymology. Ján Stanislav suggested Slovak/Slavic Seňa and associated it with Serbo-Croatian names Senj, Senje and Polish Sienino. Branislav Varsik suggested Slavic personal name Seňa used not only among early Slovaks, but known also from the territories of present-day Czech Republic, Serbia and Croatia.

The Hungarian form Szina is probably the same phonetic adaptation (e → i) which is documented also for Senné, Veľký Krtíš District (Senná, in medieval documents also as Scinna, Zynna).

History
In historical records the village was first mentioned in 1249 (Schena) when King Béla IV installed here German free colonists from Košice (hospites de Cassovia). The village, being an important marketplace, passed to Čaňa village in 1255 and in 1402 to local Lord Miklos Perényi as a royal donation. Ján Jiskra gave the village to Košice.

In 1567 the village was destroyed by Turks. In 1528 Ferdinand I of Habsburg defeated in battle the army condottiere Ján Zapolyai. In 1652 it was burned again by Turks. In the 17th century it passed to the Rozgonyi and Báthory noble families.

Before World War II, there was a large Jewish community of about 136 Jews. Most of the Jews in the community were murdered by the Nazis in The Holocaust.

Geography

Ethnicity

Culture
Birthplace of Andreas Jaszlinszky.

References

External links

Villages and municipalities in Košice-okolie District